William D. Gertz (born March 28, 1952) is an American editor, columnist and reporter for The Washington Times. He is the author of eight books and writes a weekly column on the Pentagon and national security issues called "Inside the Ring". During the administration of Bill Clinton, Gertz was known for his stories exposing government secrets.

Biography
Gertz was born on Long Island, New York. He has attended Washington College and George Washington University. He has also written for National Review, The Weekly Standard and Air Force Magazine. He has lectured on defense, national security, and media issues at the Defense Department’s National Security Leadership Program, Johns Hopkins University School of Advanced International Studies, the FBI National Academy, the National Defense University, and the CIA. He has been a media fellow at the Hoover Institution on War, Revolution and Peace at Stanford University. He lives in Maryland.

In 2008, Gertz was subpoenaed to the Santa Ana, California federal court to testify in the case of Chi Mak, who was convicted of providing United States Navy technology to China. Gertz refused to answer questions about his sources, citing the Fifth Amendment.

Gertz was a senior editor at the Washington Free Beacon until October 2019, when he was fired upon the discovery of "a previously undisclosed financial transaction." Gertz had taken a 100,000 US dollar loan from Guo Wengui, whom Gertz called a "leading Chinese dissident" in his reports. Gertz later rejoined The Washington Times full time.

Writings
During 1996 Gertz reported in The Washington Times on Chinese sales of nuclear technology to Pakistan. In 1997 he reported on Russian aid to Iran's nuclear weapon program, based on information given him by the Israeli intelligence agency Mossad. In 1998 he reported on United States sale of missile technology to China. In 2004, Gertz wrote that Syria, possibly with the aid of Russian troops, transferred Iraqi weapons of mass destruction stockpiles to its own military installations.

Gertz's 2000 book, The China Threat: How the People's Republic Targets America, presented the case that China's military was more modern and powerful than was its reputation in the United States military and intelligence communities. His 2002 book, Breakdown: How America's Intelligence Failures Led to Sept. 11, examined the activities of United States intelligence agencies prior to the 2001 terrorist attacks. His 2004 book, Treachery: How America’s Friends and Foes Are Secretly Arming Our Enemies, accused United States allies, including France and Germany of helping to arm terrorists. His 2008 book, The Failure Factory: How Unelected Bureaucrats, Liberal Democrats, and Big Government Republicans Are Undermining America's Security and Leading Us to War, said that many federal bureaucrats hold liberal views on foreign policy.

Books
 Betrayal: How the Clinton Administration Undermined American Security (1999)
 The China Threat: How the People's Republic Targets America (2000)
 Breakdown: How America's Intelligence Failures Led to September 11 (2002)
 Treachery: How America’s Friends and Foes Are Secretly Arming Our Enemies (2004)
 Enemies: How America's Foes Steal Our Vital Secrets – And How We Let It Happen (2006)
 The Failure Factory: How Unelected Bureaucrats, Liberal Democrats, and Big Government Republicans Are Undermining America's Security and Leading Us to War (2008)
 iWar: War and Peace in the Information Age (2017)
 Deceiving the Sky: Inside Communist China's Drive for Global Supremacy (2019)

References

External links

 Official website
 

American male journalists
George Washington University alumni
People from Long Island
1952 births
Living people
The Washington Times people
Washington College alumni
National Review people
American political writers